Alton (2006 pop.: 1,906) is a rural community in the Canadian province of Nova Scotia, located in  Colchester County. Originally named Polly Bog, the name was changed in 1880. Alton is the location of a natural gas storage facility currently under construction from salt caverns. Environmental groups, some residents living near the cavern site and members of the Mi'kmaq community oppose the project.

The Canadian National Railway line between Truro, Nova Scotia and Halifax, Nova Scotia passes through Alton.

Navigator

References

External links

Communities in Colchester County